Saint Lupus may refer to:
Lupus of Troyes (c. 383–c. 478), early bishop of Troyes
Lupus of Sens (died 623), bishop of Sens
Lupus of Novae, slave of Saint Demetrius of Thessaloniki